Marco Richter (born 24 November 1997) is a German footballer who plays as a forward for Bundesliga club Hertha BSC.

Club career

Early years
Born in Friedberg, Bavaria, Richter started his career with local side SV Ried 1951. After being scouted by German giants Bayern Munich on a talent day, he played for their youth department between 2004 and 2012. After eight seasons in Munich he joined the FC Augsburg academy, and on 22 May 2015 he made his debut for the Augsburg reserves in a 2–1 loss to the FC Ingolstadt 04 reserves in the German fourth division. In the following season, he scored seven goals in 16 regular season appearances and two relegation matches. Concurrently, with 24 goals in 16 appearances for the FC Augsburg Under-19 team, Richter helped secure promotion to the Under 19 Bundesliga. In the 2016–17 season for the reserves, Richter scored 23 goals in 27 appearances, making him third on the topscorer list for the season. On 30 July 2016, he attracted nationwide attention when the FC Augsburg reserves won 12–0 over SV Seligenporten, with Richter scoring seven goals in the match.

FC Augsburg
After impressing for the reserve team, Richter was called up for the senior squad and made his Bundesliga debut on 14 October 2017, coming on as an 87th-minute substitute for Kevin Danso in a 2–2 draw against TSG 1899 Hoffenheim. On 4 February 2018, Richter made his first professional goal in a 3–0 home win over Eintracht Frankfurt. His first brace also came against Frankfurt, on 14 April 2019, in a 3–1 away win.

International career
Richter made his debut for the Germany under-21 team on 7 September 2018 in a 3–0 win over Mexico. His first goals for the side came during the 2019 UEFA European Under-21 Championship against Denmark, which Germany won 3–1.

Honours
Germany U21
UEFA European Under-21 Championship: Runner-up 2019

Individual
European Under-21 Championship Bronze Boot: 2019

Career statistics

References

External links
Profile at the Hertha BSC website

1997 births
Living people
People from Aichach-Friedberg
Sportspeople from Swabia (Bavaria)
Footballers from Bavaria
Association football forwards
German footballers
Germany under-21 international footballers
Olympic footballers of Germany
FC Augsburg II players
FC Augsburg players
Hertha BSC players
Regionalliga players
Bundesliga players
Footballers at the 2020 Summer Olympics